Rivoli Theatre or Rivoli Theater may refer to:

Australia
 Rivoli Cinemas, a multiplex in Melbourne, Australia also known as Rivoli Theatre
 Rivoli Theatre, Naracoorte, South Australia, built 1935

United States
 Rivoli Theater, former name of The Bessesen Building, Albert Lea, Minnesota, U.S.
 Rivoli Theater (Indianapolis, Indiana), U.S.
 Rivoli Theatre (South Fallsburg, New York), U.S.
 Rivoli Theatre, at 750 Seventh Avenue, a former movie theater in New York City

Other places
 Rivoli Theatre (Portugal), in Porto, Portugal

See also
 Rivoli Cinema or Beirut VII, an archaeological site in Beirut
 The Rivoli bar and performance place in Toronto, where the Kids in the Hall honed their craft